The men's foil was one of eight fencing events on the fencing at the 1984 Summer Olympics programme. It was the nineteenth appearance of the event. The competition was held from 1 to 2 August 1984. 58 fencers from 26 nations competed. Nations had been limited to three fencers each since 1928. The event was won by Mauro Numa of Italy, the nation's sixth victory in the men's foil (behind only France with seven). His countryman Stefano Cerioni took bronze. The silver medal went to Matthias Behr, West Germany's first medal in the event and the first medal for any German athlete since 1928. France's five-Games podium streak ended.

Background

This was the 19th appearance of the event, which has been held at every Summer Olympics except 1908 (when there was a foil display only rather than a medal event). Two of the six finalists from 1980 returned: silver medalist Pascal Jolyot of France and sixth-place finisher Petru Kuki of Romania. The 1980 gold medalist, Vladimir Smirnov of the Soviet Union, had died after an accident during the 1982 world championships. The bronze medalist, Alexandr Romankov also of the Soviet Union, was kept out of the tournament, along with the other two 1980 finalists, due to the Soviet-led boycott. Romankov would have been a heavy favorite: he had won silver at the 1976 Games, bronze in 1980, and won the world championships in 1974, 1977, 1979, 1982, and 1983. In the absence of the Soviets, Poles, and Hungarians, the French, Italian, and West German teams were expected to dominate.

Bolivia, the People's Republic of China, Chinese Taipei, Jordan, Saudi Arabia, and the Virgin Islands each made their debut in the men's foil. France and the United States each made their 17th appearance, tied for most of any nation; France had missed only the 1904 (with fencers not traveling to St. Louis) and the 1912 (boycotted due to a dispute over rules) foil competitions, while the United States had missed the inaugural 1896 competition and boycotted the 1980 Games altogether.

Competition format

The 1984 tournament used a three-phase format similar to that of 1976 and 1980, though the final phase was different.

The first phase was a multi-round round-robin pool play format; each fencer in a pool faced each other fencer in that pool once. There were three pool rounds: 
 The first round had 10 pools of 5 or 6 fencers each, with the top 4 in each pool advancing.
 The second round had 8 pools of 5 fencers each, with the top 3 in each pool advancing.
 The third round had 4 pools of 6 fencers each, with the top 4 in each pool advancing.

The second phase was a truncated double-elimination tournament. Four fencers advanced to the final round through the winners brackets and four more advanced via the repechage.

The final phase was a single elimination tournament with a bronze medal match. (This was changed from a 6-man final round-robin pool in previous years.)

Bouts in the round-robin pools were to 5 touches; bouts in the double-elimination and final rounds were to 10 touches.

Schedule

All times are Pacific Daylight Time (UTC-7)

Results

Round 1

Round 1 Pool A

Round 1 Pool B

Round 1 Pool C

Round 1 Pool D

Round 1 Pool E

Round 1 Pool F

Round 1 Pool G

Round 1 Pool H

Round 1 Pool I

Round 1 Pool J

Round 2

Round 2 Pool A

Round 2 Pool B

Round 2 Pool C

Round 2 Pool D

Round 2 Pool E

Round 2 Pool F

Round 2 Pool G

Round 2 Pool H

Round 3

Round 3 Pool A

Round 3 Pool B

Round 3 Pool C

Round 3 Pool D

Double elimination rounds

Winners brackets

Winners group 1

Winners group 2

Winners group 3

Winners group 4

Losers brackets

Losers group 1

Losers group 2

Losers group 3

Losers group 4

Final round

Final classification

References

Foil men
Men's events at the 1984 Summer Olympics